In mathematics, the real coordinate space of dimension , denoted  or  is the set of the -tuples of real numbers, that is the set of all sequences of  real numbers. 
Special cases are called the real line  and the real coordinate plane .
With component-wise addition and scalar multiplication, it is a real vector space, and its elements are called coordinate vectors.

The coordinates over any basis of the elements of a real vector space form a real coordinate space of the same dimension as that of the vector space. Similarly, the Cartesian coordinates of the points of a Euclidean space of dimension  form a real coordinate space of dimension .

These one to one correspondences between vectors, points and coordinate vectors explain the names of coordinate space and coordinate vector. It allows using geometric terms and methods for studying real coordinate spaces, and, conversely, to use methods of calculus in geometry. This approach of geometry was introduced by René Descartes in the 17th century. It is widely used, as it allows locating points in Euclidean spaces, and computing with them.

Definition and structures 
For any natural number , the set  consists of all -tuples of real numbers. It is called the "-dimensional real space" or the "real -space".

where each  is a real number.

The real -space has several further properties, notably:
 With componentwise addition and scalar multiplication, it is a real vector space. Every -dimensional real vector space is isomorphic to it.
 With the dot product (sum of the term by term product of the components), it is an inner product space. Every -dimensional real inner product space is isomorphic to it.
 As every inner product space, it is a topological space, and a topological vector space.
 It is a Euclidean space and a real affine space, and every Euclidean or affine space is isomorphic to it.

These properties and structures of  make it fundamental in almost all areas of mathematics and their application domains, such as statistics, probability theory, and many parts of physics.

The domain of a function of several variables 

The use of the real -space, instead of several variables considered separately, can simplify notation and suggest reasonable definitions.

If
 is continuous (by )
 is continuous (by )
then  is not necessarily continuous.

Vector space 

The coordinate space  forms an -dimensional vector space over the field of real numbers with the addition of the structure of linearity, and is often still denoted .

The zero vector is given by

and the additive inverse of the vector  is given by

This structure is important because any -dimensional real vector space is isomorphic to the vector space .

Matrix notation

and sometimes as a row vector:

The coordinate space  may then be interpreted as the space of all  column vectors, or all  row vectors with the ordinary matrix operations of addition and scalar multiplication.

The formula for left multiplication, a special case of matrix multiplication, is:

Any linear transformation is a continuous function (see below).

Standard basis

The coordinate space  comes with a standard basis:

To see that this is a basis, note that an arbitrary vector in  can be written uniquely in the form

Geometric properties and uses

Orientation 
If one permutes coordinates (or, in other words, elements of the basis), the resulting orientation will depend on the parity of the permutation.

It has important consequences for the theory of differential forms, whose applications include electrodynamics.

For even  it preserves orientation, while for odd  it is reversed (see also improper rotation).

Affine space 

 understood as an affine space is the same space, where  as a vector space acts by translations. Conversely, a vector has to be understood as a "difference between two points", usually illustrated by a directed line segment connecting two points. The distinction says that there is no canonical choice of where the origin should go in an affine -space, because it can be translated anywhere.

Convexity 

Corresponding concept in an affine space is a convex set, which allows only convex combinations (non-negative linear combinations that sum to 1).

In the language of universal algebra, a vector space is an algebra over the universal vector space  of finite sequences of coefficients, corresponding to finite sums of vectors, while an affine space is an algebra over the universal affine hyperplane in this space (of finite sequences summing to 1), a cone is an algebra over the universal orthant (of finite sequences of nonnegative numbers), and a convex set is an algebra over the universal simplex (of finite sequences of nonnegative numbers summing to 1). This geometrizes the axioms in terms of "sums with (possible) restrictions on the coordinates".

Euclidean space 

The dot product

defines the norm  on the vector space . If every vector has its Euclidean norm, then for any pair of points the distance

As for vector space structure, the dot product and Euclidean distance usually are assumed to exist in  without special explanations. However, the real -space and a Euclidean -space are distinct objects, strictly speaking. Any Euclidean -space has a coordinate system where the dot product and Euclidean distance have the form shown above, called Cartesian. But there are many Cartesian coordinate systems on a Euclidean space.

Actually, any positive-definite quadratic form  defines its own "distance" , but it is not very different from the Euclidean one in the sense that

Such a change of the metric preserves some of its properties, for example the property of being a complete metric space.

In algebraic and differential geometry 
Although the definition of a manifold does not require that its model space should be , this choice is the most common, and almost exclusive one in differential geometry.

On the other hand, Whitney embedding theorems state that any real differentiable -dimensional manifold can be embedded into .

Other appearances 
Other structures considered on  include the one of a pseudo-Euclidean space, symplectic structure (even ), and contact structure (odd ). All these structures, although can be defined in a coordinate-free manner, admit standard (and reasonably simple) forms in coordinates.

Polytopes in Rn 

There are three families of polytopes which have simple representations in  spaces, for any , and can be used to visualize any affine coordinate system in a real -space. Vertices of a hypercube have coordinates  where each  takes on one of only two values, typically 0 or 1. However, any two numbers can be chosen instead of 0 and 1, for example  and 1. An -hypercube can be thought of as the Cartesian product of  identical intervals (such as the unit interval ) on the real line. As an -dimensional subset it can be described with a system of  inequalities:

This is a dual polytope of hypercube. As an -dimensional subset it can be described with a single inequality which uses the absolute value operation:

but this can be expressed with a system of  linear inequalities as well.

The third polytope with simply enumerable coordinates is the standard simplex, whose vertices are  standard basis vectors and the origin . As an -dimensional subset it is described with a system of  linear inequalities:

Replacement of all "≤" with "<" gives interiors of these polytopes.

Topological properties 
It is also identical to the natural topology induced by Euclidean metric discussed above: a set is open in the Euclidean topology if and only if it contains an open ball around each of its points. Also,  is a linear topological space (see continuity of linear maps above), and there is only one possible (non-trivial) topology compatible with its linear structure. Actually, it does not depend much even on the linear structure: there are many non-linear diffeomorphisms (and other homeomorphisms) of  onto itself, or its parts such as a Euclidean open ball or the interior of a hypercube).

 has the topological dimension .

An immediate consequence of this is that  is not homeomorphic to  if  – an intuitively "obvious" result which is nonetheless difficult to prove.

Despite the difference in topological dimension, and contrary to a naïve perception, it is possible to map a lesser-dimensional real space continuously and surjectively onto . A continuous (although not smooth) space-filling curve (an image of ) is possible.

Examples

n ≤ 1 
Cases of  do not offer anything new:  is the real line, whereas  (the space containing the empty column vector) is a singleton, understood as a zero vector space. However, it is useful to include these as trivial cases of theories that describe different .

n = 2 

The case of (x,y) where x and y are real numbers has been developed as the Cartesian plane P. Further structure has been attached with Euclidean vectors representing directed line segments in P. The plane has also been developed as the field extension  by appending roots of X2 + 1 = 0 to the real field  The root i acts on P as a quarter turn with counterclockwise orientation. This root generates the group { i, –1, –i, +1} ≅ ℤ/4ℤ. When (x,y) is written x + y i it is a complex number.

Another group action by ℤ/2ℤ, where the actor has been expressed as j, uses the line y=x for the involution of flipping the plane (x,y) ↦ (y,x), an exchange of coordinates. In this case points of P are written x + y j and called split-complex numbers. These numbers, with the coordinate-wise addition and multiplication according to jj=+1, form a ring that is not a field.

Another ring structure on P uses a nilpotent e to write x + y e for (x,y). The action of e on P reduces the plane to a line:  It can be decomposed into the projection into the x-coordinate, then quarter-turning the result to the y-axis: e (x + y e) = x e since e2 = 0. A number x + y e is a dual number. The dual numbers form a ring, but, since e has no multiplicative inverse, it does not generate a group so the action is not a group action.

Excluding (0,0) from P makes [x : y] projective coordinates which describe the real projective line, a one-dimensional space. Since the origin is excluded, at least one of the ratios x/y and y/x exists. Then [x : y] = [x/y : 1] or [x : y] = [1 : y/x]. The projective line P1(R) is a topological manifold covered by two coordinate charts, [z : 1]  → z or [1 : z] → z, which form an atlas. For points covered by both charts the transition function is multiplicative inversion on an open neighborhood of the point, which provides a homeomorphism as required in a manifold. One application of the real projective line is found in Cayley–Klein metric geometry.

n = 3

n = 4 

 can be imagined using the fact that  points , where each  is either 0 or 1, are vertices of a tesseract (pictured), the 4-hypercube (see above).

This is usually associated with theory of relativity, although four dimensions were used for such models since Galilei. The choice of theory leads to different structure, though: in Galilean relativity the  coordinate is privileged, but in Einsteinian relativity it is not. Special relativity is set in Minkowski space.

Euclidean  also attracts the attention of mathematicians, for example due to its relation to quaternions, a 4-dimensional real algebra themselves. See rotations in 4-dimensional Euclidean space for some information.

In differential geometry,  is the only case where  admits a non-standard differential structure: see exotic R4.

Norms on 
One could define many norms on the vector space . Some common examples are

The case  is very important, because it is exactly the Euclidean norm.
This is the limit of all the p-norms: .

 for all .

Here is a sketch of what a proof of this result may look like:

The proof is divided in two steps:

In this step you use the fact that every  can be represented as a linear combination of the standard basis: . Then with the Cauchy–Schwarz inequality  where .
Assume there is no such . This sequence is bounded because . So because of the Bolzano–Weierstrass theorem there exists a convergent subsequence  with limit  . Now we show that  but , which is a contradiction. This implies , so . On the other hand , because .

See also 
 Exponential object, for theoretical explanation of the superscript notation
 Geometric space
 Real projective space

Footnotes

References

ⁿ
Topological vector spaces
Analytic geometry
Multivariable calculus
Mathematical analysis